The Mask Singer Season 2 is a Thai singing competition program presented by Kan Kantathavorn. It aired on Workpoint TV on Thursday at 20:00 from 6 April 2017 to 17 August 2017.

Panel of Judges

First round

Group A

Group B

Group C

Group D

Semi-final

Group A

Group B

Group C

Group D

Final

Champ VS Champ

First round

Second round

Champ of the Champ

Celebration of The Mask Champion

Elimination table

References

The Mask Singer (Thai TV series)
2017 Thai television seasons